Essex girl, as a pejorative stereotype in the United Kingdom, applies to a woman viewed as promiscuous and unintelligent, characteristics jocularly attributed to women from the county of Essex. It is applied widely throughout the country and has gained popularity over time, dating from the 1980s and 1990s.

Negative stereotype
The stereotypical image formed as a variation of the dumb blonde/bimbo persona, with references to the Estuary English accent, white stiletto heels, mini skirts, silicone-augmented breasts, peroxide blonde hair, over-indulgent use of fake tan (lending an orange appearance), promiscuity, racism, loud verbal vulgarity, and socialising at downmarket nightclubs.

Time magazine recorded:

Accent 
As mentionned above, the stereotypical Essex girl has an Estuary English accent, but with a very modern element to it. It has some pronunciation features of the Cockney accent but without the traditional element, and a very modern prosody.

Here are some examples of pronunciation features of the Essex girl stereotype:

Segments:

Vowels: 
 Strong diphthongization of the FLEECE, happY and GOOSE vowels 
 The FACE and GOAT vowels may be very open 
 Very open utterance-final /ə/
 The sequences /uːl/, /ʊl/, /ɔːl/ and /əl/ may all be pronounced

Consonants: 
 The sequences /ən/ and /əm/ are nearly never syllabic consonants.
 Very strong tendency to vocalise coda-/l/, thus  instead of 
 Final /ɪŋ/ can have  or the typically northern 
 Strong degree of t-glottalization  and glottal reinforcement before /t, p, k/ → 
 The /k/ in like may be glottalized as well.
 Frequent th-fronting

Prosody:

Isochrony: 
 Tendency to lengthen the final syllables of words or sentences: happen ; coudn't ; lovely ; what's that?

Intonation: 
 Dipping tone on the final segments of words or sentences: basically ; someone else ; say to me

Challenging the stereotype
In 2004, Bob Russell, Liberal Democrat MP for Colchester in Essex, appealed for debate in the House of Commons on the issue, encouraging a boycott of The People tabloid, which has printed several derogatory references to girls from Essex.

The Essex Women's Advisory Group was set up in 2010 to combat the negative stereotyping of girls living in Essex by supporting Essex-based women's charities helping those in need as well as by funding projects that promote women's and girls' learning and success in science, technology, the arts, sports and business. The charitable fund is administered by the Essex Community Foundation. 

On 6 October 2016, Juliet Thomas and Natasha Sawkins of The Mother Hub launched a campaign on social media to draw attention to the negative definition of Essex girl in the Oxford English Dictionary and Collins Dictionary. Their main goal was to raise awareness and to open a dialogue around the derogatory "Essex girl" stereotype. Their campaign centred on changing the definition of "Essex girl" to "a girl from or living in Essex" by encouraging women to use the hashtag #IAmAnEssexGirl and included a petition to change or remove the dictionary definitions. The campaign reached the national press. In December 2020, after campaigning by the Essex Girls Liberation Front, the Oxford Advanced Learner’s Dictionary, used to teach non-native English speakers, removed the term.

See also

 Chav
 Airhead (subculture)
 Ah Lian
 Essex man
 Valley girl
 Trixie
 The Only Way Is Essex
 Educating Essex

References

Further reading 
 
 Germaine Greer, "Long Live the Essex Girl", 4 March 2001, The Guardian

1980s slang
1990s slang
British slang
Girl
Pejorative terms for women
Stereotypes of women
Youth culture in the United Kingdom
Socioeconomic stereotypes